Farhiyo Farah Ibrahim is a Somali social activist and interpreter. She is an advocate for women's rights and reproductive health.

Personal life
Ibrahim was born between 1982 and 1983 in Somalia. During the civil war that broke out in the early 1990s, her grandfather was killed by armed militants and her mother was assaulted. She subsequently moved to Kenya in 1992, living in the UNCHR refugee compound in Dadaab.

After finishing eighth grade, Ibrahim left school to support her kin. She was later estranged from her family after refusing to marry a much older man.

Ibrahim is a Muslim.

Career
In 2002, Ibrahim worked as a reproductive health motivator for the National Council of Churches in Kenya. She therein promoted voluntary counseling and testing for HIV/AIDS as well as contraceptive use, and campaigned against female genital mutilation. The nature of her counseling work was a source of tension with her family and the wider, socially conservative Somali community, who felt that it was unbecoming of her background. Due to pressure, Ibrahim eventually quit her job at the NCCK.

As of 2008, Ibrahim serves as an interpreter. She also advocates for the rights of women and girls.

Awards
In 2008, Ibrahim was presented the International Women of Courage Award for her advocacy work.

References

1980s births
Living people
Year of birth uncertain
Ethnic Somali people
Somalian women's rights activists
Somalian women activists
Recipients of the International Women of Courage Award